The Fender Bass V was a model of electric bass guitar produced by Fender between 1965 and 1971. It was the world's first five-string bass guitar.

At the time the electric bass guitar was still a relatively new instrument, and some manufacturers were still experimenting with design variations that would be considered radical by today's standards. (See the rather unrelated Fender Bass VI for example.)

The Bass V was three inches longer than a Precision Bass, but only had 15 frets. It featured a high C string instead of the low B string much more common on modern five-string basses. This was supposed to allow reading bass players to reach high notes on the instrument more easily. The top note on the instrument is still the same E as on a standard 20-fret 4 string Jazz or Precision Bass, so strictly speaking the Bass V cannot be regarded as an extended-range bass.

The Bass V originally came with chromed bridge- and pickup-covers.

The innovative concept did not resonate with bass players, partly due to its size and shape.
Many also had problems with the narrow string-spacing. Consequently only about 200 instruments were produced, before the model was discontinued in 1971. Surplus bodies were used in the construction of the Fender Swinger.

In 2016, Squier released the Gary Jarman Signature Bass with a body shape influenced by the Bass V.

Players
Players reported to have owned a Fender Bass V include:
 James Jamerson
 John Paul Jones of Led Zeppelin
 Fred Turner of Bachman-Turner Overdrive
 Walter Becker of Steely Dan

See also
 Fender Jazz Bass V
 Fender Bass V Community Site

Literature

 Peter Bertges. The Fender Reference. Bomots, Saarbrücken. 2007. .

References

Bass V